Branchville is the name of several places in the United States of America:

 Branchville, Alabama
 Branchville, Connecticut
 Branchville, Georgia
 Branchville, Indiana
 Branchville, Maryland
 Branchville, New Jersey
 Branchville, South Carolina